The England Boxing National Amateur Championships Cruiserweight Championship formerly known as the ABA Championships is the primary English amateur boxing championship. It had previously been contested by all the nations of the United Kingdom.

History
The cruiserweight division is the newest division only being inaugurated in 1998 and is currently contested in the under-86 Kg weight division. The championships are highly regarded in the boxing world and seen as the most prestigious national amateur championships.

Winners

References

England Boxing